The 2021–22 season is SV Darmstadt 98's 124th season in existence and the club's fifth consecutive season in the 2. Bundesliga, the second tier of German football and 22nd overall. The club will also participate in the DFB-Pokal.

Background and pre-season

Darmstadt 98 finished the 2020–21 season in 7th place, 11 points below the automatic promotion places and 13 points below the promotion play-off place. Manager Markus Anfang left the club at the end of the previous season and was replaced by Torsten Lieberknecht in June 2021.

Pre-season

Competitions

2. Bundesliga

League table

Matches

DFB-Pokal

Transfers

Transfers in

Loans in

Transfers out

Loans out

Appearances and goals
Source:
Numbers in parentheses denote appearances as substitute.
Players with names struck through and marked  left the club during the playing season.
Players with names in italics and marked * were on loan from another club for the whole of their season with Darmstadt.
Key to positions: GK – Goalkeeper; DF – Defender; MF – Midfielder; FW – Forward

Notes

References

Darmstadt
SV Darmstadt 98 seasons